Rodrigo Cuba Piedra (born 17 May 1992) is a Peruvian footballer who plays as a right-back for Sport Boys.

Club career
Rodrigo Cuba began his senior career with Alianza Lima. He made his Torneo Descentralizado league debut on matchday 1 of the 2012 season in 2–2 draw at home against León de Huánuco. In his debut season Cuba made total of 18 league appearances.

References

External links
 
 

1992 births
Living people
Footballers from Lima
Peruvian footballers
Peruvian expatriate footballers
Club Alianza Lima footballers
José Gálvez FBC footballers
Juan Aurich footballers
Club Universitario de Deportes footballers
Deportivo Municipal footballers
Sport Boys footballers
Club Atlético Zacatepec players
Atlético Morelia players
Club Deportivo Universidad César Vallejo footballers
Peruvian Primera División players
Ascenso MX players
Association football fullbacks
Peruvian expatriate sportspeople in Mexico
Expatriate footballers in Mexico